Robert Patterson Grant (April 12, 1814 – November 13, 1892) was a Scottish-born merchant and political figure in Nova Scotia, Canada. He sat for the Pictou division in the Senate of Canada from 1877 to 1892.

The son of Lewis Grant, he was born in Inverness and educated at the Inverness Royal Academy. Grant came to Canada in 1833, moving to Nova Scotia in 1835. In 1840, he married Annie Carmichael. Grant was the president of the Pictou Bank. He represented the East Region of Pictou County in the Legislative Assembly of Nova Scotia from 1859 to 1863 as a Liberal. Grant died in office at the age of 78.

References 

1814 births
1892 deaths
Members of the House of Commons of Canada from Nova Scotia
Liberal Party of Canada MPs
Canadian senators from Nova Scotia
Nova Scotia Liberal Party MLAs
People educated at Inverness Royal Academy
Scottish merchants
Scottish emigrants to pre-Confederation Nova Scotia
People from Inverness
19th-century Scottish businesspeople